Özbay is a Turkish surname constructed by fusing the Turkish names Öz ("self", "essence", "extract") and Bay ("mister", "gentleman"). Notable people with the surname include:
 Cansu Özbay (born 1996), Turkish volleyball player
 Ekmel Özbay (born 1966), Turkish professor of Electrical and Electronics Engineering and Physics Departments at Bilkent University
 Mehmet Özbay (1956–1996), false identity of Abdullah Çatlıa, a Turkish secret government agent

Turkish-language surnames